L’Espalier was a French restaurant located in Boston, Massachusetts, in the Back Bay neighborhood, adjacent to the Mandarin Oriental Hotel. The chef and owner of L'Espalier was Frank McClelland, who received a James Beard Foundation Award in 2007 for Best Northeast Chef.

History 
Chef Moncef Meddeb opened L'Espalier on Boylston Street between Arlington and Berkeley in 1978. It moved to an 1880s-era brick townhouse on Gloucester Street in 1982 and was purchased by McClelland in 1988. The restaurant moved again into the Mandarin Oriental complex in 2008. It was designed by Martin Vahtra of Projects Design in New York. L'Espalier is known locally as a popular place for marriage proposals and celebrity sightings.

On March 27, 2013 McClelland celebrated their 35th anniversary with a specially designed six course tasting menu including Jonah crab bisque, branzino and rack of lamb.

L'Espalier closed permanently upon the expiration of its lease on December 31, 2018.

Food 

L'Espalier served locally grown produce prepared in classically French ways, offering lunch in the afternoon and dinner nightly with tea service on the weekends 1:30 to 3:00 p.m. Patrons could choose from three prix-fixe menu, the seasonal degustation (tasting) menu or the Chef's tasting journey. First courses included almond-dusted veal sweetbreads with morels and wilted baby mustard greens, with main course options such as pan-roasted East Coast halibut and Vermont rabbit.

Staff 
 Frank McClelland: Chef/Proprietor
 Logan Foos: Chef de Cuisine
 Louis Risoli: Maitre d’ & Fromager

Awards and accolades

 AAA Five-Diamond Award recipient: 2018, 2017, 2016, 2015, 2014, 2013, 2012, 2011, 2010, 2009, 2008, 2007, 2006, 2005, 2004, 2003, 2002, 2001, 2000
 Mobil Four-Star Award recipient: 2018, 2017, 2016, 2015, 2014, 2013, 2012, 2011, 2010, 2009, 2008, 2007, 2006, 2005, 2004, 2003, 2002, 2001, 2000, 1999, 1998
 Zagat Survey of Boston Restaurants, "#1 Food" Rating:2015, 2006, 2005, 2004, 2003, 2002, 2001, 2000, 1999, 1998
 DiRoNa Award recipient: 2005, 2004, 2003, 2002, 2001, 2000, 1999, 1998

See also
 List of French restaurants

References

External links 
 

Defunct restaurants in Boston
Restaurants established in 1978
Restaurants disestablished in 2018
1978 establishments in Massachusetts
2018 disestablishments in Massachusetts
Defunct French restaurants in the United States
French restaurants in Massachusetts